"Shiver" is a song by Australian singer Natalie Imbruglia, released as the first single from her third studio album, Counting Down the Days (2005), on 21 March 2005. The song reached  19 in her native Australia and at No. 8 on the UK Singles Chart. It also peaked at No. 1 in Hungary and No. 6 in Italy.

Chart performance
"Shiver" reached No. 8 on the UK Singles Chart. Shiver was officially Britain's most broadcast track in 2005, indicating most played on radio, MTV and commercial use. In Europe, "Shiver" was the sixth-most-played song of 2005, accumulating 2,733,820 audience points and 31,423 plays during the year. Shiver became Natalie Imbruglia's biggest pan-European airplay track since "Torn" and as a result is considered her second-biggest hit. The song was covered by Maxïmo Park on BBC Radio 1's Live Lounge. Lara Krost performed the song during Season 5 of Australian Idol. In 2006, Shiver was nominated in the APRA (Australasian Performing Right Association) category for 'Most Performed Foreign Work'. It was also nominated for an Ivor Novello Award for 'Most Performed Track'. As of 2011, "Shiver" had sold approximately 500,000 copies worldwide.

Music video
The music video, inspired by the movie The Bourne Supremacy, started airing around February 2005. It was directed by Jake Nava who has also directed the music video for Britney Spears' hit, My Prerogative, and Holly Valance's State of Mind. It was filmed in Kyiv, Ukraine, during winter, giving the video a bleak appearance, but also "intriguing visuals for a seemingly ordinary pop song.".

A departure from Imbruglia's previous video styles, Shiver had a spy-themed, action-packed plot with car chases and switched identities. Imbruglia burns her passport and personal effects, then steals a Citroën CX to make her escape. She is followed by her unnamed enemy, in this case men driving a GAZ Volga 3110 and a BMW 5 Series (E34). Imbruglia is unusually calm despite these circumstances, implying that this is a typical occurrence. Imbruglia manages to escape both sets of her pursuers, alters her appearance, and obtains new fake passport, in order to take a train to another city, but she remains a fugitive on the run.

Track listings

UK CD single 
 "Shiver"  – 3:42
 "My Own Movie"  – 4:05

UK maxi-single 
 "Shiver"  – 3:42
 "When You're Sleeping"  – 3:04
 "Pineapple Head"  – 3:21
 "Shiver"  – 3:20

European enhanced maxi-single 
 "Shiver"  – 3:42
 "When You're Sleeping"  – 3:04
 "Pineapple Head"  – 3:21
 "Shiver" (edit)  – 3:20
 "Shiver"

Charts

Weekly charts

Year-end charts

Release history

References

2005 singles
2005 songs
Music videos directed by Jake Nava
Music videos shot in Ukraine
Natalie Imbruglia songs
Number-one singles in Hungary
Song recordings produced by Stephen Lipson
Songs written by Eg White
Songs written by Natalie Imbruglia
Songs written by Sheppard Solomon